Arosa is a town and a municipality in the Plessur Region in the canton of Graubünden in Switzerland. It is both a summer and a winter tourist resort.

On 1 January 2013, the former municipalities of Calfreisen, Castiel, Langwies, Lüen, Molinis, Peist and St. Peter-Pagig merged into the municipality of Arosa.

At the end of 2013 the Arosa ski resort was linked with Lenzerheide by cable-car, creating the new ski resort of Arosa Lenzerheide; since that change, transport passes have been valid in both resorts.

The official language of Arosa is (the Swiss variety of Standard) German, but the main spoken language is the local variant of the Alemannic Swiss German dialect.

The resort is known throughout Switzerland for its famous ice hockey team, the EHC Arosa which used to be one of the most successful teams in the country.

History
Arosa is first mentioned about 1330 as Araus.  In 1383 it was mentioned as Orossen and in 1428 it was first mentioned as Arosa.

The first known settlements are from the 13th century. After 1300 Arosa German-speaking Walser settlers came from Davos and replaced the original Romansh-speaking inhabitants. During the following centuries, the village had a subsistence alpine pasture economy. Until 1851 it was politically a part of the Davos municipality. Arosa was established as a health resort by a German doctor in 1883, and the first sanatorium was opened in 1888. From 1900 on it gradually developed as a winter resort. In 1938 the first ski lifts were built, and in 1956 the Weisshorn cable car was opened and further rope and chair lifts followed.

In 1851 Arosa separated from the municipality of Davos.

Skiing in Switzerland received a big boost from Sir Arthur Conan Doyle, author of the Sherlock Holmes series. Conan Doyle, an avid sportsman, was wintering in Davos. For entertainment, he ordered some skiing "boards" from Norway and hiked up the mountain with two local guides. They then skied down into Arosa, ending their journey with a luncheon at a local inn, the Seehof, the first hotel in Arosa. Conan Doyle wrote of his pioneering Davos/Arosa ski adventure in a British magazine, The Strand, in 1894, and the story attracted British skiers to Switzerland.

Erwin Schrödinger was vacationing in Arosa at Christmas 1925 when he made his breakthrough discovery of wave mechanics.

In 1933, Thomas Mann stayed in Arosa during the first week of his Swiss exile.

The 1939 film Over the Moon (shot 1937–9) has brief Technicolor exterior shots of the train station and ski resort areas.

On 20 February 1940, Germany's Hassall met with British J. Lonsdale Bryant in Arosa, to make a plan to overthrow the ruling German Nazi Adolf Hitler.

The Cinema Museum in London holds film of the resort from 1959,

Geography

Of this, 42% is used for agriculture, and 15.2% is forested. 3.1% is settled (buildings and roads) and the remainder (39.7%) includes the rivers, glaciers and mountains which attract tourists which constitute the primary industry.

Before 2017, the municipality was in the Schanfigg sub-district of the Plessur district, after that date it was part of the Plessur Region. Located on the south-east slope of the Weisshorn chain, the town of Arosa is at the top of the Schanfigg valley at the foot of the Aroser Weisshorn.

The two lakes in the centre of Arosa are the Obersee (upper lake) and Untersee. The town's railway station is at the end of a branch line from Chur.

Tourism

The main industry is tourism: there are 4287 guest beds. Arosa has an unemployment rate of 1.32%. , there were only 4 people employed in the primary economic sector and about 2 businesses involved in this sector. 308 people are employed in the secondary sector and there are 30 businesses in this sector. 1,202 people are employed in the tertiary sector, with 185 businesses in this sector.

Demographics

, 22.0% of the population was made up of foreign nationals. Over the last 10 years the population has decreased by 9.8%, but fluctuates seasonally from about 4600 in January to about 2500 in May. Most of the population speak German (79.8%), with Portuguese being second most common language (7.3%) and Italian third (4.1%).

, there were 51.1% males and 48.9% females. The age distribution, in Arosa is: 7.0% between 0 and 9 years old; 3.2% are 10 to 14; 4.5% are 15 to 19. 26.2% are between 20 and 29 years old. 18.0% are 30 to 39, 14.5% are 40 to 49, 11.6% are 50 to 59. 7.0% are between 60 and 69 years old, 4.9% are 70 to 79, 2.3% are 80 to 89, and 0.6% are 90 to 99.

In the 2007 federal election the most popular party was the SVP which received 45% of the vote.  The next three most popular parties were the FDP (24.7%), the SP (17%) and the CVP (12%).

In Arosa about 70.3% of the population between age 25-64 have completed either non-mandatory upper secondary education or additional higher education (either university or a Fachhochschule).

The remainder belong to other religions or did not specify a religion.

The historical population is given in the following table:

Heritage sites of national significance

The archeological site of Carschlingg near Castiel, a prehistoric, late-Roman and Early Middle Ages settlement, and the Langwieser Viaduct for the Rhätische Bahn are listed as Swiss heritage site of national significance.  The hamlets of Medergen, Sapün and Strassberg are all part of the Inventory of Swiss Heritage Sites.

Climate

Arosa experiences a subarctic climate (Köppen: Dfc) similar to that of Valdez, Alaska, with short, cool summers, and long cold, but not severely cold winters. Precipitation is abundant year round, and so is snowfall, with annual totals averaging 285 inches (723 cm).

Between 1961 and 1990 Arosa had an average of 147 days of rain per year and on average received  of precipitation. The month with the most days of precipitation was June, with 15.6, but with only  of precipitation.

Transportation
The Rhaetian Railway operates frequent train services on the Chur–Arosa railway to Chur.

Notable people 

 Carl Rüedi (1848 – 1901 in Arosa) a Swiss pulmonologist, treated author Robert Louis Stevenson
 Egbert Coleby Morland FRCS FRCP (1874–1955) an English physician, he practised as a pulmonary specialist in Switzerland 1903–1914, first at Davos and then in Arosa
 Lieutenant Alfred Michael Koch MC (born 1894 in Arosa – 1984) a Swiss-born Canadian flying ace credited with ten aerial victories
 Paul ten Bruggencate (1901 in Arosa – 1961) a German astronomer and astrophysicist. 
 Karl-Heinz Kipp (1924 – 2017 in Arosa) a German billionaire, lived in Arosa and owned the Tschuggen Grand Hotel
 Youri Messen-Jaschin (born 1941 in Arosa) an artist of Latvian origin, he often combines oils and gouaches.
 Sport
 David Zogg (1902–1977) a Swiss alpine and Nordic combined skier. He was raised in Arosa
 Werner Lohrer (1917 in Arosa – 1991) an ice hockey player, bronze medallist at the 1948 Winter Olympics
 Heini Lohrer (1918 in Arosa – 2011) an ice hockey player, bronze medallist at the 1948 Winter Olympics 
 Roger Staub (1936 in Arosa – 1974) an alpine ski racer and Olympic gold medalist at the 1960 Winter Olympics 
 Werner Geeser (1948 in Arosa – 2011) a Swiss cross-country skier, competed in the 1972 Winter Olympics
 Engelhard Pargätzi (born 1959 in Arosa) a retired Swiss alpine skier who competed in the 1976 Winter Olympics
 Isabel Waidacher (born 1994 in Arosa) a Swiss ice hockey player, six-time Swiss champion with the ZSC Lions Frauen

See also 
1304 Arosa

References

External links

Tourism information
Alpine Pearls
Livecams of Arosa

 
Ski areas and resorts in Switzerland
Municipalities of Graubünden
Cultural property of national significance in Graubünden